General transcription factor IIH subunit 2 is a protein that in humans is encoded by the GTF2H2 gene.

Function 

This gene is part of a 500 kb inverted duplication on chromosome 5q13. This duplicated region contains at least four genes and repetitive elements which make it prone to rearrangements and deletions. The repetitiveness and complexity of the sequence have also caused difficulty in determining the organization of this genomic region. This gene is within the telomeric copy of the duplication. Deletion of this gene sometimes accompanies deletion of the neighboring SMN1 gene in spinal muscular atrophy (SMA) patients but it is unclear if deletion of this gene contributes to the SMA phenotype. This gene encodes the 44 kDa subunit of RNA polymerase II transcription initiation factor IIH which is involved in basal transcription and nucleotide excision repair. Transcript variants for this gene have been described, but their full length nature has not been determined. A second copy of this gene within the centromeric copy of the duplication has been described in the literature. It is reported to be different by either two or four base pairs; however, no sequence data is currently available for the centromeric copy of the gene.

Interactions 

GTF2H2 has been shown to interact with GTF2H5, XPB and ERCC2.

See also 
Transcription Factor II H

References

Further reading

External links 
 

Transcription factors